Acostambo District is one of sixteen districts of the Tayacaja Province in Peru.

Geography 
Other mountains are listed below:

See also 
 Tampu Mach'ay

References